The Hispanic Council On Social Policy Center For Community Development is a Community Based Organization (CBO) located in the City of Paterson, New Jersey. It was established to provide resources to the Hispanic Hispanic community within the County of Passaic. The agency was founded by longtime advocate of parent self-empowerment Jesus R. Castro along with a group of community members that felt a need for more Hispanic representation in policy decision making at the local level.

Purpose
The Hispanic Council On Social Policy Center For Community Development Corporation is a community based, community operated, non-profit organization created to serve the needs of the Hispanic community via programs, service and advocacy. The mission of the "Council" requires individuals of good faith serve those suffering from a variety of socioeconomic needs surpassing cultural bounds in an effort to reach those "at-risk" within the County of Passaic with special emphasis on the urban communities of Paterson, Clifton, and Passaic City, New Jersey.

History
The "Council" was established in 2010 to create and provide resources for the fast-growing Hispanic population within the County of Passaic. It owes its origin to a group of newly settled Hispanic migrants who experienced the need for an agency to represent and orient the Spanish speaking in their new environment. With the support and leadership of local stakeholders and the cooperation of non-Hispanic representatives, the group was founded as the Hispanic Council On Social Policy Center For Community Development Corporation (HCSPCCD). This new entity proclaimed its mission to provide vital resources to the community at large with major emphasis on older at-risk youth and low-income families struggling with social disparities,

Mission

Hispanic Council On Social Policy Center For Community Development Corporation (HCSPCCD) is a community driven multi-purpose social services’ agency. The Hispanic Council was created as a witness to the unique human needs of the under-served minority groups suffering from a wide array of social disparities within the County of Passaic.

Purpose
The organization strives to create and provide resources needed for the advancement of people unable to surpass socio-economic situations beyond their control. We aspire to nurture the development of youth and families in regard to education development and prevention of high-risk behaviors. We intend to further outreach to all at-risk populations regardless of race, creed or national origin in an effort to advocate for social justice.

References

External links
Official Website
Paterson Press

Hispanic and Latino American culture in New Jersey
Non-profit organizations based in New Jersey
Social justice organizations
Paterson, New Jersey